Andreas Mershin is a physicist at the Center for Bits and Atoms in the Massachusetts Institute of Technology.

Education
He received his MSci in physics from Imperial College London (1997) and his PhD in Physics from Texas A&M University  (2003), under Dimitri V. Nanopoulos, where he studied the theoretical and experimental biophysics of the cytoskeleton. He performed molecular dynamic simulations on tubulin. Under an NSF grant he conducted cross-disciplinary research that experimented with surface plasmon resonance, dielectric spectroscopy and molecular neurobiology. Mershin tested the hypothesis that the neuronal microtubular cytoskeleton is involved in memory encoding, storage, and retrieval in Drosophila.

Career
Mershin researches bio- and nano- materials at the Center for Bits and Atoms at MIT, where he develops bioelectronic photovoltaic and machine olfaction  applications using membrane proteins integrated onto semiconductors. Mershin has patented in the field of bioenergy harvesters, he is also a co-founder of the Royal Swedish Academy of Sciences' international annual "Molecular Frontiers Inquiry Prize" for the best scientific question posed by children.

See also 
 Quantum Aspects of Life (book)

References

External links
 Official Website
 Bio Nano Technology-New Frontiers in Molecular Engineering: Andreas Mershin at TEDxAthens
 Mershin's New Scientist article on a Nobel prize for children
 Mershin in MIT's newspaper
 The Emerging Physics of Consciousness   Chapter 4: Towards Experimental Tests of Quantum Effects in Cytoskeletal Proteins

Living people
Alumni of Imperial College London
Texas A&M University alumni
American biophysicists
21st-century American physicists
Year of birth missing (living people)